Capazes (meaning the plural of capable in Portuguese) is a Portuguese feminist organization founded in 2014 by TV hosts Rita Ferro Rodrigues and Iva Domingues.

It started as a website, collecting articles by various columnists and interviews of Portuguese (mostly female) celebrities by the two TV presenters. The organization's original name was Maria Capaz (literally Mary Capable), the title of a song by rapper Capicua and a word play with the Portuguese term for tomboy, Maria-rapaz (Mary boy).

See also 

 Women in Portugal
 List of women's organizations

References 

Women's organisations based in Portugal
Women's rights organizations
Feminist organisations in Portugal
2014 establishments in Portugal
Organizations established in 2014